The Office of the President is a ministry of the Government of South Sudan in charge of presidential affairs Barnaba Marial Benjamin is the incumbent minister

References

Office of the President
South Sudan, Office of the President